Plésidy is a commune in the Côtes-d'Armor department of Brittany in northwestern France. Inhabitants of Plésidy are called plésidiens in French.

Population

Personalities
French war hero Théophile Marie Brébant (1889-1965) was born here.

See also
Communes of the Côtes-d'Armor department

References

External links

Communes of Côtes-d'Armor